Sanjarian (also Romanized as Sanjārīān, Sangareyūn, and Sangarīān) is a village in Siyahrud Rural District, in the Central District of Tehran County, Tehran Province, Iran. At the 2006 census, its population was 361, in 95 families.

References 

Populated places in Tehran County